Mariette Leslie Cotton (1866–1947) was an American artist who usually gave her name as Mrs. Leslie Cotton.  A student of William Merritt Chase, Carolus-Duran, and Jean-Jacques Henner , she worked mainly in Paris but also maintained studios in London and New York.  By birth and marriage she possessed a level of wealth and social prestige that, together with her artistic skill, enabled her to obtain lucrative commissions from prominent individuals. The portraits she painted were praised for their veracity, style, and fine technique. Their subjects included kings, aristocrats, celebrities, and members of wealthy families. Late in her career a critic wrote that her "popularity has a sound basis, for her portraits combine such abstract artistic qualities as effective and infinitely varied design and daringly unconventional arrangements of color, with strong characterization and a likeness that never fails to be convincing," and added, "her concern with the artistic problem never makes her obtrude her own personality or offend the sitter's susceptibilities."

Early life

Cotton was born on May 17, 1866, in Schenectady, New York. Her birth name was Mariette Benedict and until she was twenty she was generally known as Pansy Benedict. Her early training appears to have come from her mother, a woman who was considered to be talented both as artist and singer and she may also have received informal training from an art instructor at the college where her parents had their home. However she came by it, Cotton's talent was such that she was considered to be an accomplished amateur artist before she was twenty.

In 1888, newly married and having moved to Manhattan  from her parents' home, Cotton sought to become a student of William Merritt Chase. He agreed to teach her and at the same time asked whether she would sit for a portrait. In 1908 Chase described the meeting:  "One morning a young lady came into my Tenth street studio, just as I was leaving for an art class in Brooklyn. She came as a pupil, but the moment she appeared before me I saw her only as a splendid model. Half way to the elevated station I stopped, hastened back, and overtook her. She consented to sit for me; and I painted that day, without an interruption, till late in the evening. The result is the Lady in Black, now hung in the Metropolitan Museum." In 1889 a second Chase portrait of her, "Lady in Pink," was shown at the Spring Exhibition at the National Academy of Design in New York.

Career

In the early months of that year Cotton and her husband sailed for Europe. In leaving his position in a New York firm of importers, he indicated that the couple intended to live abroad permanently. Not long after their arrival Cotton began study in a Parisian studio run by the portraitists, Carolus-Duran and Jean-Jacques Henner, who were known for taking on women students, particularly Anglo-Americans.

Early portrait work

In 1889 a painting of Cotton's, "Portrait of Miss S.," was accepted for exhibition at the Paris Salon of that year and proved to be the only painting by an American artist to receive an award. In 1891 she showed two portraits—a pastel, "Mrs. Mahlon Sands," and an oil, "F. T. Martin, Esq."—at the annual exhibition at London's Royal Academy. A review of the 1891 exhibition in Art Journal called the portraits "meritorious performances" and a review in The Royal Academy gave a more extensive evaluation, praising her "technical mastery" in an "ultra-French style" and looking forward to her development of an artistic individuality.

By 1895 Cotton had become known for portraits she had made of prominent European men including the Duke of Cambridge and Otto von Bismarck. Early that year paintings of two men to whom she had social and family connections appeared at Knoedler's Galleries in New York. One showed her husband's friend, Samuel M. Roosevelt and the other showed Howard Potter to whom Cotton was related via her husband's first marriage. Later in the year five portraits by Cotton appeared in a loan exhibition to aid two local charities. A critic for The Sun singled out "Miss E. Winslow" as the best of the group, saying the portrait contained a "dignity and distinction quite apart from any charm of feature or expression." The critic also defended the dignity conveyed in two other portraits which the critic said had been unfairly criticized as  "unnecessarily realistic in regard to the ravages of time." Of the self-portrait a society writer said a viewer at the exhibition would be astonished because the "smiling, young, modish society woman, seemingly coming out of the frame with outstretched hand to greet you, looked too much the woman of fashion to be the hard working artist."

In the fall of the following year Cotton showed a self-portrait and portraits of two wealthy New Yorkers at Knoedler's. The sitters were William Seward Webb and James L. Breese. Writing in The Sun, a critic said the paintings were made "in a vigorous style unusual in a woman" and another, in the New York Times, saw the portraits as having minor defects but nonetheless showing "much promise and unusual cleverness." The New York Times critic associated Cotton's style with John Singer Sargent's, calling him her "master." The Times critic did not explain why he thought Cotton to be a follower of Sargent, but a few years later another critic noted that Cotton had received advice and criticism from him.

Mature style

In 1900 Cotton showed five portraits at Knoedler's. The exhibition attracted the attention of critics who praised her versatility and evident sympathy with her sitters as well as the "dash and spirit" of her style. Her relationship with Knoedler's continued with exhibitions every few years from 1901 through 1921. Critics liked the 1901 show, one praising improvement in her work.  When twenty-one portraits appeared at Knoedler's in 1904, reviewers praised her character research, directness and simplicity, and clever brushwork. One of them also noted her "ability to secure a good likeness, much power of characterization, and as a rule good drawing and effective color." A reviewer also noted an unevenness in the show, some portraits giving evidence of having been rushed or given only perfunctory attention. In 1906 Cotton was seen to have "a brilliant career before her," already earning enough from commissioned portraits to support herself and her family. By this time her sitters were increasingly from European countries, many of them titled. Two of these were women who had befriended Cotton, Lady Cunard and Lady Savile. Lady Bache Cunard was the former Maude Alice Burke, an American from a wealthy New York family. She had married an English baronet named Bache Edward Cunard who was a grandson of the founder of the Cunard Line. Prominent in London social circles, she was a noted promoter of literary and artistic careers. Gertrude Lady Savile, who was raised in a well-connected English family, developed strong ties in the United States after she married a man who had a diplomatic appointment at the British embassy in Washington, D.C. During her stay in the country she became "the toast of the town not only in the national capital, but also in New York."  After her first husband's untimely death, she married another diplomat, John Savile, who, on the death of a childless uncle, also named John Savile,  inherited a title, 2nd Baron Savile, and much wealth. Like Lady Cunard, Lady Savile was a highly respected London society matron. Acting somewhat in competition with each other, the two women worked to advance Cotton's career in London. With their help she was able to obtain commissions from a growing list of titled English sitters including Lord Howard de Walden; the daughter of a duke, Lady Marjorie Manners; and a Lady in Waiting to the Queen, the Honorable Violet Vivian. While in Marienbad during the summer of 1907, Cotton began work on a portrait of an English socialite named Mrs. Hall Walker. A close friend of Edward VII, Walker provided Cotton with an introduction that resulted in a request from the king that she paint his portrait as well. Mrs. Hall Walker, later Baroness Wavertree, was a popular hostess seen as liking to surround herself with beautiful women such as Cotton.  Begun in Marienbad, the portrait was completed the following winter at Cotton's London studio.  When the portrait was shown in an exhibition at Knoedler's later that year, a critic praised an innovative informality of clothing and pose which revealed the king's amiability without compromising his dignity. The portrait pleased him so much that he commissioned another, more formal, portrait of himself and one of the queen. Early in 1914, Cotton brought some of her London portraits to New York for exhibition at Knoedler's eliciting this concise evaluation from a critic for the Brooklyn Daily Eagle: "There is little doubt of the talent of Mrs. Leslie Cotton, who shows portraits in oil, in the upper gallery at Knoedler's, for she paints with conviction, with much feeling and with convincing result."

From the time of her marriage through the 1920s Cotton lived mainly in London and Paris, making frequent visits to New York. She showed her work infrequently in New York galleries, instead inviting acquaintances to her studio to see recently completed portraits and ones still in progress. These events, usually afternoon teas, became popular among the social set in which she moved. On the occasions that she did show her work in New York galleries the exhibitions were widely reported in the press. For example, when in 1917 she showed fifteen portraits she had made in Paris over the previous few years, the exhibition attracted notice from the New York Herald, the Christian Science Monitor, the Sun, the Schenectady Gazette, American Art News, and the Fine Arts Journal. Reviewers praised the show in general, saw some unevenness in the quality of her work, and were impressed with both the social standing and attractiveness of her sitters. One influential critic, Henry McBride, said "Mrs. Cotton realizes her personages for us so vividly that one is tempted to run off into personal gossip rather than to thread the tedious intricacies of a discussion of artistic technique." During the years when she made her home abroad Cotton had paintings accepted for exhibition in the annual Paris Salons. Her appearances were infrequent early in her career and nearly annual during the 1920s.

Throughout her career Cotton moved about frequently and had no permanent or even long-term studio. She sometimes worked in hotel rooms and occasionally stayed in a private home as the guest of one of her sitters. During the winter of 1902-1903 she painted Mrs. Henry Flagler at her home in Palm Beach. In August 1903 she stayed with one of her sitters, Mrs. William B. Leeds, as her guest in Bar Harbor on the Leeds's yacht and by December of that year she had a studio in New York that was likened to a drawing room complete with luxurious old tapestries. A year later she was painting in a studio within an apartment hotel, the Schuyler, on West 45th Street. In 1906 she occupied rooms in a London townhouse owned by her friend, Lady Savile. The following summer, when she began work on her portrait of King Edward, she had a studio in Marienbad and while completing that portrait during the winter months she was occupying a studio on Tite Street in Chelsea that had formerly been used by James McNeill Whistler. In 1913 her she had another London studio, this one on Devonshire Street, and two years later, in the midst of World War I, she was working in Paris. Returning to the United States in 1916, she painted portraits in private houses and had no studio. During the 1920s she worked mainly in Paris studios and thereafter, until the end of her life, mainly in New York.

The society woman as professional artist

During the time that Cotton was establishing herself as a professional artist reporters found it odd that an influential society woman would, as one of them said, challenge the successful male portraitists such as Sargent or George Burroughs Torrey. Another showed surprise that a woman would prefer to be better known as artist than as hostess. A third saw her as a type of new woman such as Gertrude Vanderbilt Whitney, Edith Wharton, Emily Post,  and other successful women in American literature and the arts. As a fourth put it, "The true American society woman does not think millions an excuse for idleness." A fifth echoed this sentiment and elaborated: "In the circles of great wealth are a dozen women who are doing meritorious work with brush, pen, and chisel. And they are professionals in the fullest sense of the word. ... In every case they are professionals because they wish to be tested on the broadest basis of merit. Hence they put their work side by side with the product of those who make their living in such ways and let the purchaser decide which is the most meritorious."

Throughout her career critics noted Cotton's popularity with the public and her success in gaining prestigious commissions. They found much to like in many of her portraits but some complained of unevenness in her output and even sloppy handling. In 1917 a reviewer said, "Mrs. Cotton is a disappointing painter in that her work varies so greatly, some of it unusually good, and some of it so weak as to make it difficult to understand how it could proceed from the same brush." In 1926 another reviewer attributed at least some of this variability to a necessary compromise. As a professional portraitist she was obliged to please her subjects. This meant that at least some of the time she had to balance her desire to create good art with the sitter's desire to be presented in a certain way. The reviewer suggested that Cotton's best work was made when she painted "for her own pleasure" and was not forced to make this compromise.

After she turned sixty years old, Cotton rarely showed her work and attracted little notice from the press. She attended the occasional social function, including a function at the White House at the invitation of Eleanor Roosevelt in 1940, but seems to have remained quietly in New York during the last years of her life.

Personal life

At the time of her birth Cotton's family lived on the campus of Union College. Although both her parents had ties to it, neither worked at the school. Her father, Samuel Tweedy Benedict, had entered as a freshman in 1856 and graduated in 1860.  He went on to become a lawyer and state legislator.  Her mother, Julia Averill Jackson Benedict, was a daughter of Isaac Jackson, who had taught at the college and who, by living with them after his retirement, helped assure that they were welcome to make their home there. Sources vary as to the year of her birth. They give May 17 as month and day, but some give 1866 as year and others give 1868. The sources most likely to be accurate give the former. Cotton received at least part of her early education at home from a governess.

As noted above, Cotton may have received early art training from her mother and a Union College art teacher. When she was twenty Cotton married a man who had connections both to her family and to Union College. Her husband was Joseph Leslie Cotton whose connection to Cotton and Union College came via his first marriage to Maria Louisa Potter who had died in childbirth six years before. She was the granddaughter of Alonzo Potter, a Union College vice president, and Sarah Maria Nott Potter, daughter of the school's president. Cotton was herself related to the Potter family, although the relationship was apparently a distant one. Cotton was seen to have an attractive personality and appearance. Shortly after her marriage a reporter called attention to her beauty and some years later she was included among the women featured in An American Book of Beauty (New York, Harper & Bros., 1904). In 1903 and again in 1907 she was credited with great charm of manner.

Cotton's husband, Joseph Leslie Cotton, was born in Barbados in 1856 to Dudley Page Cotton and Rebecca Jane Roach Cotton. Dudley P. Cotton was a successful merchant, trading in the West Indies, who belonged to a wealthy and well connected family based originally in New Hampshire. At the time of his first marriage J. Leslie Cotton had lived in Boston and managed a ranch in Wyoming Territory. By the time he married Cotton in 1888 he had joined with two friends in a New York firm that imported wine and spirits from Europe. He left the firm when he and Cotton, then married, decided to live abroad. The couple's wealth together with Cotton's gift for social advancement enabled them to gain acceptance within the British aristocracy and a few years after their arrival in London they were granted the privilege of a presentation to the Court at Buckingham Palace. While living in both Paris and London they were known for the "entertainments" they hosted. In 1893, while staying in London, their first and only child was born, a son named Hugh Dudley Benedict Cotton. By 1901 J. Leslie Cotton had re-established himself in New York and was working as an architect. Cotton continued to reside mainly abroad and during her visits to the United States the society press would make note of events that the two of them attended together. Increasingly, however, their social activities would be reported separately and in 1916 it was apparent that they were separated when they both attended a performance at the Metropolitan Opera yet sat in separate boxes. When their son married in New York in 1920 a New York address was given for his father and his mother was listed as "Mrs. Cotton of Paris." By 1921 they had divorced and at J. Leslie Cotton's death in 1929 the New York Times obituary listed survivors but made no mention of Cotton as former wife.

Other names

Cotton generally used Mrs. Leslie Cotton as her professional name, but early in her career she was called (in France) Mlle. M. Cotton and Miss or Mrs. Mariette Cotton (in the United States). After her divorce she sometimes used Mariette Leslie Cotton or Mariette Cotton.

Apart from professional use, the names used for her include the following:
Miss Mariette Benedict, her maiden name, sometimes given as Miss Marietta Benedict. 
Pansy Benedict, her nickname.
Mrs. Leslie-Cotton.
Mrs. Marietta Leslie Cotton.
Marietta Benedict Cotton.

Portraits

A list of people who were well known among their contemporaries for whom Cotton made portraits.

Notes

References

1866 births
1947 deaths
19th-century American painters
20th-century American painters
20th-century American women artists
19th-century American women artists
American socialites
Artists from New York (state)